Thomas Kröger (born 11 June 1979) is a German former volleyball player. He competed in the men's tournament at the 2008 Summer Olympics.

References

External links
 

1979 births
Living people
German men's volleyball players
Olympic volleyball players of Germany
Volleyball players at the 2008 Summer Olympics
People from Melle, Germany
Sportspeople from Lower Saxony